FC Emmen is a Dutch football club based in Emmen, Drenthe. They play in the Eredivisie, the top tier of Dutch football, after winning the 2021–22 Eerste Divisie title. Founded in 1925, the club entered the professional Eerste Divisie in 1985. In 2018, Emmen were promoted to the Eredivisie for the first time, but in 2021 they were relegated to the Eerste Divisie again. 2022 they were promoted again and play the 2022-2023 season in the Eredivisie again. Home games are played at De Oude Meerdijk.

History
The amateur club Emmen was formed on 21 August 1925. When the Dutch professional league was formed in 1954, Emmen opted to maintain its amateur club status instead.

In 1985, Emmen finally joined the professional ranks. In 1988 the club was split into an amateur and a professional section. The latter was mostly called BVO Emmen ( Betaald Voetbal Organisatie, professional football organisation). In 2005, the professional club Emmen changed its name into FC Emmen, for two reasons. Firstly, it was hoped that the new name would better reflect the club's history, and secondly because many misunderstandings had arisen, among people who had grown to believe that BVO was an abbreviation similar to for instance PSV, RBC or ADO.

FC Emmen has reached the Eerste Divisie play-offs eleven times and on 20 May 2018, they managed to clinch promotion to the Dutch Eredivisie for the first time in their history after beating Sparta Rotterdam 3–1 in the promotion/relegation play-off finals.

They played their first Eredivisie match on 12 August 2018 against ADO, and won the match by 1–2. Glenn Bijl made the first goal for FC Emmen in the Eredivisie.

Emmen finished 14th in their first Eredivisie season and secured their spot in the Eredivisie for the 2019–2020 season.

Despite a very poor start to the 2020–21 season (six points in the first 22 matches), Emmen incredibly bounced back with an 8-match unbeaten run (five wins, three draws) from February to April, and ended the season with two wins to finish with 30 points. However, they could not achieve automatic safety, as they had a worse goal differential than 15th-placed RKC Waalwijk. This meant that Emmen would have to win the playoffs to avoid relegation, but they lost on penalties following a 1-1 draw vs. NAC Breda. As a result of this loss, FC Emmen were relegated to the Eerste Divisie following three seasons in the top tier.

Stadium
FC Emmen's previous JenS Vesting, more popularly known as De Meerdijk, now as de Oude Meerdijk was the scene of several matches of the 2005 FIFA World Youth Championship.

Sponsors

Results

Coaching staff

Players

Current squad

Honours
 Eerste Divisie
 Winner: 2021–22

 Sunday amateur football title
 Winner: 1974–75

 Sunday Hoofdklasse C
 Winner: 1974–75

Former technical directors
 Rob Groener
 Gerard Somer

References

External links

 Official website
 Official supporters website

 
Association football clubs established in 1925
1925 establishments in the Netherlands
Football clubs in the Netherlands
Football clubs in Emmen, Netherlands